Sambe is a presumably extinct Plateau language of Nigeria once spoken in the village of the same name. The Sambe people have shifted to Ninzo.

For example, 
 "cough"
 "choose"

References

Languages of Nigeria
Alumic languages
Extinct languages of Africa
Languages extinct in the 21st century